Gorges is a commune in the Manche department in north-western France.

See also
 The Anglo-Norman Gorges family has its origins in Gorges, Manche.
 Communes of the Manche department

References

Communes of Manche
Manche communes articles needing translation from French Wikipedia